Herbert M. Welch [Dutch] (October 19, 1898 – April 13, 1967) was an American backup shortstop in Major League Baseball who played briefly for the Boston Red Sox during the  season. He was born in Ro Ellen, Tennessee.
 
In a 13-game career, Welch was a .289 hitter (11-for-38) with two runs, one triple, and two RBI without any home runs.

Welch died at the age of 68 in Memphis, Tennessee.

See also
1925 Boston Red Sox season

External links
Baseball Reference
Retrosheet

1898 births
1967 deaths
Boston Red Sox players
Major League Baseball shortstops
Baseball players from Tennessee
Paris Travelers players
Paris Parisians (KITTY League) players
Mobile Bears players
Portageville Pirates players
Jackson Generals (KITTY League) players
Bowling Green Barons players
Jonesboro White Sox players
Hopkinsville Hoppers players